The 2011 Women's Premier Soccer League season was the 15th season of the WPSL.

Changes from 2010

Name changes

New franchises

Folding

Standings
Blue indicates division titleYellow indicates qualified for playoffs

Pacific Conference

North Division

South Division

Big Sky Conference
The Big Sky regional playoffs were cancelled due to a high number of players returning to college.

North Division

South Division

Sunshine Conference

North West Conference

Midwest Conference

North Division

South Division

East Conference
Boston Aztec U23 received a bye to the conference semifinals.

NorthEast Division

Mid-Atlantic Division

Playoffs
Home teams listed second

Eastern Conference

Big Sky Conference
The Big Sky regional playoffs were cancelled due to a high number of players returning to college.

Midwest/Sunshine Conferences
The planned final match, between the Midwest playoff champion and the Sunshine champion, was instead played as the national Semifinal as the winner would have played the Big Sky playoff champion in the semifinals.

Pacific Conference

WPSL Championship

Composite top 16 bracket

References

External links
 WPSL standings

Women's Premier Soccer League seasons
2